Claret School of Quezon City, also referred to by its acronym CSQC or colloquially as Claret, is a private Catholic basic education institution run by the Missionary Sons of the Immaculate Heart of Mary in Quezon City, Philippines. It was established by the Claretians in June 1967 and was named after its patron saint, St. Anthony Mary Claret, who founded the Claretians in 1849. The school also has a Child Study Center which allows girls up to the Kindergarten level.

History 

The Claretian fathers dreamt of building a school in the Philippines after they had started their missions in Zamboanga and Basilan. They needed a base to serve as the center for Claretian activities in the country.

In the late 1960s, Fr. José Querexeta, CMF, former bishop of the Territorial Prelature of Isabela, acquired a 29,101 square meter lot in UP Village, Diliman, Quezon City. In 1967, the construction of the first two buildings of the school (Xifré and Clotet) were supervised by Fr. Miguel Mialet, CMF. Fr. Santiago González, CMF was the first school director and principal.

Under Fr. Santiago's guidance, the school quickly grew to include the Intermediate Grade School Department in 1968 and the High School Department in 1972. In the 1970s the school upgraded the old covered court into a gymnasium, and the Immaculate Heart of Mary Parish church was built.

In 1981, González was replaced by Fr. Julián Mateos, CMF; Fr. Jesús Vásquez, CMF; Fr. Emilio Pablo, CMF; Fr. Luis Fernández Rey, CMF; and Fr. Domingo Moraleda, CMF. From 1981 until 1995, supervision of the school was transferred to Dr. Enrique Coralejo, a lay director.

The 1990 Luzon earthquake forced the school to make reinforcements to the main buildings. During the same decade, the Sala building was completed as the last of the five main buildings of the campus. The Vilaró and Fàbregas buildings were also built during the 1990s. From 1995 until 2000, Fr. Agapito Ferrero, CMF was the school director.

In 2000, Fr. Felimon P. Libot, CMF became the first Claretian priest of Filipino descent to be assigned as school director. He was superseded by Fr. Salvador G. Agualada, CMF in 2006.

In 2007, the school celebrated its 40th anniversary and the TLE building was completed.

In the middle of SY 2008–2009, Fr. Domingo Moraleda, CMF, former school director, died in an accident in Mabalacat, Pampanga.

On June 1, 2009, Fr. Eduardo C. Apungan, CMF took office as the school director. He was superseded in 2010 by Fr. Renato L. Manubag, CMF. In May 2013, Very Rev. Fr. Christian James L. Castro, CMF assumed directorship of the school. In 2016, Very Rev. Fr. Efrén Limpo, CMF assumed position as the 14th school director of Claret School of Quezon City. He was succeeded by Very Rev. Fr. Mauricio T. Ulep, the current school director.

The first elementary graduates completed their studies in 1971, while the pioneer high school class graduated in 1975 with 38 students. A plaque with the names of the first 38 high school graduates can be seen in the main lobby of Claret School.

On October 22, 2016, Claret School of Quezon City was honored with the Quezon City Manuel L. Quezon Gawad Parangal Award for Most Outstanding Institution for 2016 at the Crowne Plaza Galleria Hotel, Ortigas Avenue, Quezon City.

On February 5, 2022, Claret School of Quezon City's founder and first school director and principal, CMF. Fr. Santiago Gonzales had passed away.

Organization
Claret School of Quezon City is composed of the Child Study Center, the Grade School department and the High School department. The Grade School and High School units were established in 1967, while the Child Study Center was opened in June 2001.

Child Study Center
The Center admits 3-year-old boys and girls for Junior Nursery, 4-year-olds for Senior Nursery and 5-year-olds for the Kindergarten level. From Kindergarten, the curriculum ladder extends to the Preparatory (prep) level which was integrated to the Grade School in 1967.

Elementary and secondary education
The Grade School unit of Claret School of Quezon City was accredited by the PAASCU on March 15, 1978. It was granted reaccreditation in 1982, 1988, 1994, 2000, 2005, 2010, 2015 and the latest is valid until 2020. The High School unit received its accreditation by PAASCU on April 19, 1991. It was granted reaccreditation in 1995, 2001, 2006, and 2010.

Aside from its membership in the PAASCU, Claret School of Quezon City also takes active roles in the Catholic Educational Association of the Philippines (CEAP),  the QC-Marikina Grade School Consortium, and the Private Secondary School Administrators Association of the Philippines (PRISSAAP).

In sports, Claret School won its first Philippine Athletic Youth Association (PAYA) Basketball Championship in the 1974–1975 season, beating San Agustin in the Finals.

Expansion
In the school year 2003–2004, the Association of Claret Schools in the Philippines, Inc. (ACSPI) was formally established and this further strengthened the linkages of the six Claret Schools in the Philippines: Claret School of Quezon City, Claret School of Zamboanga City, Claret College of Isabela City, Claret School of Lamitan City, Claret School of Maluso and Claret School of Tumahubong in Basilan Province.

Sports
Claret School of Quezon City is noted for its football program which was established in the 1970s by priests Luis Rey and Santiago Gonzales. Bob Salvacion, coach and a former player himself, is a major contributor to the program establishing the Claret Football Center in 1981. Claret is also one of the founding members of the Rizal Football Association (RIFA). In 2011, Claret organized a girls' team despite the school being a boys exclusive school.

Notable alumni

Sports
Kurt Alvarez - (GS '02) former football player, Kaya F.C.
Marco Casambre - (HS '16) current football player, Kaya-Iloilo F.C. and Philippines national football team
Raphael Russel Castro - (GS '07, HS '11) former football player, UP Fighting Maroons and Philippines national under-19 football team
Japs Cuan - (GS) former basketball player, UST Growling Tigers men's basketball
Ronald "Mac" Cuan - (HS '97) former basketball player, Sta. Lucia Realtors, De La Salle Green Archers; former head coach and current assistant coach, Alab Pilipinas
Oliver "Ricky" Dandan - ('80) current assistant coach, UP Fighting Maroons men's basketball team and Kia Picanto (PBA team)
Anto Gonzales - (HS '99) former football player, Loyola Meralco Sparks F.C. and Philippines national football team; current head coach, UP Fighting Maroons men's football team (2009, 2011, 2012 and 2016 UAAP champion) and women's football team (2016 UAAP champion)
Alfonzo Gotladera - (GS '06) former basketball player, De La Salle Green Archers and Ateneo Blue Eagles; current basketball player, San Miguel Beermen and Philippines men's national basketball team
Dionisio Hipolito III - (HS '06) former basketball player, UP Fighting Maroons
JC Intal - (GS/HS) former basketball player, Ateneo Blue Eagles; current basketball player, Phoenix Fuel Masters
Jun Jeffri Lidasan - (HS '10) taekwondo jin, UP Fighting Maroons
Dustin Jacob Mella - (HS '12) 3-time SEA Games gold medalist, poomsae/taekwondo
Raphael Enrico Mella - (HS '14) 3-time SEA Games gold medalist, poomsae/taekwondo
Kenneth Raval - (HS '06) head coach, UP Fighting Maroons women's basketball team
Hagen Topacio - (HS '07) trap shooter, Philippines national shooting team
José Ariston Caslib - (HS '85) Former Head Coach of Meralco Manila and Head Coach of San Beda University Red Booters

Arts, media and entertainment
Jules Guiang - (GS '05, HS '09) news anchor and TV host, People's Television Network; founder, board chairman, National Alliance of Youth Leaders
Miko Manguba - (GS '08, HS '12) musician, Star Music, former artist of GMA Records and Top One Project
Arman Ferrer - (GS '02) musical theater actor/classical singer; Aliw and Gawad Buhay awardee
Oscar Oida - (GS '89, HS '93) news reporter, GMA Network
Vivo Ouano - (GS '00) actor, contestant StarStruck (season 3)
Kazuyuki Tanaka (+) - (HS '12) musician, Viva Records
Jose Victor Torres, PhD - (GS '79 HS '83) historical researcher and consultant; screenwriter; Palanca awardee (play)
James Velasquez - (GS '00, HS '04) sportscaster, TV5 (Philippines)
Migs Gomez - (GS '10, HS '14) UAAP Season 80-81 Courtside Reporter, ABS-CBN Sports; Maharlika Pilipinas Basketball League Commentator
Joshua Colet - (HS ‘13) Actor, ABS-CBN
Dax Augustus Tapay - (HS '06) Actor, FPJ's: Ang Probinsyano; ABS-CBN
Zandro Amiel Ochona - (HS '01) TV and Radio Reporter, TV Patrol; ABS-CBN; DZMM Radyo Patrol 48

Politics
Hernani Braganza - (HS' 81) former mayor, Alaminos, Pangasinan; former Secretary of Agrarian Reform
Winston Castelo - (HS '81) former councilor, 2nd District, Quezon City; current representative, 2nd District, Quezon City
Norberto "Bart" Linao - (GS '80, HS '84) former Mayor, Morong, Bataan
Siegfred Mison - (GS '78) former commissioner, Bureau of Immigration
Deogracias Savellano - (HS '77) former governor, Ilocos Sur
Robert Victor Seares Jr. - (HS '98) Mayor, Dolores, Abra
Gabriel Paolo "Heart" Frias Diño - (HS '06) Former Student Council President UP Diliman, LGBT rights advocate

Military
General Gregorio Pio Catapang - (HS '77) Chief of Staff, Armed Forces of the Philippines

Others
Reyancarlo Buan - architect, Araneta Center
Richard "Richie" Fernando, SJ (+) - (HS) Jesuit missionary and Servant of God
Bo Sanchez - (HS) Catholic Charismatic preacher; founder of the Light of Jesus Community.

References

External links 
 

Educational institutions established in 1967
Catholic elementary schools in Metro Manila
Catholic secondary schools in Metro Manila
Schools in Quezon City
1967 establishments in the Philippines